Said ibn Amir al-Jumahi was a companion of the Islamic prophet Muhammad and Governor of Homs in Syria during the caliphate of Omar.
When Caliph Umar asked a delegation from people of Homs to provide list of needy people of hums so that he could make arrangement for meeting those needs, among other people name of governor said ibn Aamir was also in that list. Caliph Umar sent thousand gold coins(Asharfi in arabic).But said ibn Aamir distributed these instead putting these to his own use.

Life 
As a youth, he was among the thousands who left for Tanim on the outskirts of Mecca at the invitation of the Quraysh to witness the killing of Khubayb ibn Adi, a companion of Muhammad whom they had captured and whose death was to be in revenge for Quraysh losses in the Battle of Badr. After accepting Islam shortly following Khubayb’s death Sa'id migrated to Medina and attached himself to Muhammad, participating in the Battle of Khaybar and other engagements thereafter. After Muhammad's death in 632 he continued active service under his two successors, Abu Bakr and Umar, who both knew Sa'id for his honesty and piety and listened to his advice.

Governor of Homs 
Umar appointed him as governor of Homs (Emesa) in Syria, which was then called 'little Kufa' because, like Kufa, its inhabitants complained a lot about their leaders. During a visit to Syria, Umar asked the people of Homs if they had any complaints against their governor, to which they mentioned four. Umar summoned Sa'id, and in his presence asked the representatives of Homs to state their complaints.

The first complaint was that he left his home late every morning, to which Sa'id replied that he had no servants, and that following prayers, read the Quran and assisted his wife in preparing meals, which took some time. The second complaint was that he did not attend to anyone at night, which he explained was due to his practice of reserving the night for prayer. The third complaint was that once a month he left his house late in the afternoon, which he explained was a result of washing and drying his one change of clothes. The fourth complaint was that he occasionally fell into fits of unconsciousness. Sa'id explained that in Mecca he had witnessed Khubayb ibn Adi's torture and death by the Quraysh. The Quraysh offered him safety and protection for his wealth if he disowned Muhammad, but he spurned the offer. Sa'id added, that being a polytheist at the time he did nothing to aid Khubayb and whenever he recalls the event he becomes overwhelmed with remorse and passes out. Umar dismissed the complaints and said:

It is said that during his tenure as governor of Homs he choose to live in poverty and humbleness despite his high rank

See also

 
 Battle of Khaybar
 List of Sahaba

References

Companions of the Prophet
Year of birth missing
Year of death missing
Rashidun governors of Hims